Sclerostropheus is an extinct genus of tanystropheid archosauromorph from the Late Triassic of Italy. The type species is S. fossai.

References 

Tanystropheids